A1, A-1, A01 or A.1. may refer to:

Education 
 A1, the Basic Language Certificate of the Common European Framework of Reference for Languages
 Language A1, the former name for "Language A: literature", one of the IB Group 1 subjects
 A1, a secondary school subdivision in the  Congolese education system
 A1, a baccalauréat series in the education system of some parts of France
 A1, a baccalaureate in the Gabonese education system, see Education in Gabon
 A1, the highest category of Qualified Flying Instructor in the Central Flying School of the UK Royal Air Force

Grades 
 A1, a grade for the Leaving Certificate, a qualification in the education system of Ireland
 A1, the highest obtainable grade for the Sijil Pelajaran Malaysia examination in Malaysia
 A1, a grade for the Senior Secondary Certificate Examination in Nigeria, see Education in Nigeria
 A1, a grade for the Singaporean GCE 'O' Level, an examination in the education system of Singapore
 A-1, an Academic grading in Pakistan commonly used in the education system of Pakistan

Entertainment 
 sound operator, a member of a theatre crew commonly designated A1

Broadcasting 
 A-One (TV channel), a Russian music channel
 A1 TV channel (Macedonia)
 A1 Report, a television station in Albania
 America One, an American television network
 A 1, see List of radio stations in Austria and Liechtenstein
 A1, a promotional name for CHIN (AM) radio in Canada
 A1, a Slovenian radio network owned by Radiotelevizija Slovenija
 A-1 Detective Agency, a fictional detective agency in the radio series I Love a Mystery

Film 

 A-1 Headline, a 2004 Hong Kong film
 A 001, operazione Giamaica (Our Man in Jamaica), a 1965 Italian adventure film directed by Ernst R. von Theumer
 A1, a 1999 Syrian film, see List of Syrian films
 A1 (2019 film), Indian Tamil film
Companies
 A1 Film Company, a Burmese cinema company
 A-1 Pictures, a Japanese animation studio

Games 
 A1 Games, an American video game publisher for the PlayStation; see List of PlayStation games (A–L)
 A1 – Slave Pits of the Undercity, a component of Scourge of the Slave Lords, and adventure module for the Dungeons & Dragons role-playing game
 Larsen's Opening, a chess move, A01 in ECO code
 A1, a square on a chessboard

Music and dance 
 Aone Beats or Aone, music producer
 A1, a part in contra dance choreography
 A-1 Sound Studios, a recording studio owned by Herb Abramson
 A-1, an American rap group behind the album Mash Confusion
 A-One (band), a Mandopop group
 A1 (band), a British-Norwegian boy band
 Floyd "A1" Bentley, record producer and reality TV star (from Love & Hip Hop: Hollywood)
 A1 x J1, a British hip hop duo

Albums 
 A1, an album by Ertuğ Ergin
 A1, an album by Tony Cetinski
 A One, an album by Ayumi Hamasaki
 A1 (album), a 2002 album by Norwegian band A1

Publications 
 A1 (comics), a comics anthology
 A-1 Comics, a 1944–1955 Golden Age comics publication
 A1—The Great North Road, a book by Paul Graham (photographer)

Finance
 A1 or A-1, two investment grades for bonds
 A1, a country risk rating assigned by Compagnie Francaise D’assurance Pour Le Commerce Exterieur (Coface)

Food
 A.1. Sauce
 A1, a colour grade used in shrimp marketing

Military 

 A-1 Skyraider, a United States military attack aircraft
 A-1 flying jacket, the predecessor of the A-2 flying jacket
 Company A-1, an outfit in the Texas A&M Corps of Cadets
 Svea Artillery Regiment, a Swedish Army regiment
 A-1 (code) was the designation for a code used by the United States Navy during World War I
 A1, a designation of military staff in the continental staff system
 A-1, a grade of Republic of China List of orders, decorations and medals of the Republic of China#General Armed Forces medals
 Forces A1, a naval force in the Battle of Crete, see Crete order of battle
 A-1, Brazilian Air Forces designation for the AMX International AMX aircraft
 Kampfgeschwader 53, from its historic Geschwaderkennung code with the Luftwaffe in World War II

Politics and government

Americas
 A-1 visa, a non-immigrant United States visa for governmental officials
 A1, an electoral alliance in Suriname, see List of political parties in Suriname

Asia
 A1, a class of South Korean visa
 A-1, a classification in the status of Indian cities

Europe
 A1, a rank in the European Civil Service
 A1, a town planning use class in England and Wales
 A1, a racial classification by law enforcement in England and Wales

Places
 A1 Mine Settlement, Victoria, Australia
 Red Bull Ring (formerly A1), a motorsport circuit in Spielberg, Austria
 List of A1 roads
 Zone A1, a zone in the Greek Alonissos Marine Park in the North Aegean Sea

Science and mathematics

Astronomy 
 A1, a class of star, see stellar classification
 "A1" subobject designations, including:
 NGC 3603-A1

Biology 

 A1 broth, a substance used to detect fecal coliforms
 ATC code A01 Stomatological preparations, a subgroup of the Anatomical Therapeutic Chemical Classification System
 Combretastatin A1, a potent cytotoxic agent
 HLA-A1, a human leukocyte antigen serotype
 Proanthocyanidin A1, an A type proanthocyanidin
Primary auditory cortex, the region of the cerebral cortex where sound is processed
 Vitamin A1, the animal form of vitamin A
 A1, a segment of the anterior cerebral artery
 The first anal vein in the Comstock-Needham system of insect wing vein naming
 Noradrenergic cell group A1
 A1, a mating type of Phytophthora infestans, the cause of potato blight

Earth sciences 
 A1, a landslide classification factor
 A-1, a class in the AASHTO Soil Classification System

Mathematics 
 A¹ homotopy theory, a concept related to algebraic topology
 A1, an 1844 paper by mathematician Hermann Grassmann
 A1, the alternating group on a set with one only element

Sports

Leagues or divisions 

 A1 Ring, the former name for the Red Bull Ring, a motorsport circuit in Spielberg, Austria
 A1, a climbing grade
 A1, a ranking in Keirin track cycling
 Class A1 (baseball), a defunct classification within Minor League Baseball

Competition 
 A1 (classification), an amputee sport classification
 A1 Grand Prix, a motorsport racing series
 A-1 Liga, the top basketball league in Croatia
 HEBA A1, the top basketball league in Greece
 Phase A1, a phase in a combined driving equestrian competition

Individuals 
 A-1 (born 1977), Canadian professional wrestler

Technology 
 A1 paper size (59.4×84.1 centimetres or 23.4×33.1 inches)
 A-1, the first series of Disney's Audio-Animatronics figures
 A-1, an alternative name for KS 150, a nuclear reactor in Czechoslovakia, decommissioned in 1979
 A.1 scale, the first formalised atomic time scale in the International Atomic Time standard

Computing 
 A-1, a programming language that was a successor to the A-0 System written by Grace Hopper in the 1950s
 A1, codename for Windows Live OneCare
 A1, a class of computer security specified in the Trusted Computer System Evaluation Criteria
 Acer Aspire One netbook computer

Commercial brands and companies 
 A1 Superlink, an Australian Internet service provider merged in 2000 into the Froggy (ISP)
 A-1 Supply, a former name of American gaming machine manufacturer International Game Technology
 A1 Telekom Austria, an Austrian mobile network operator, and its subsidiaries
 A1 Slovenija, the second largest telecommunications company in Slovenia
 A1 Bulgaria, mobile network operator in Bulgaria
 A1 Hrvatska, mobile network operator in Croatia
 A1 Belarus, mobile network operator in Belarus
 A1 Srbija, mobile network operator in Serbia
 A1 Macedonia, mobile network operator in North Macedonia

Electronic products 
 Canon A-1, a 35 mm SLR camera manufactured from 1978 to 1985
 Canon XH-A1, a handheld prosumer HDV camcorder released in 2007
 Minolta Dimage A1, a digital camera produced in 2003
 Sony HVR-A1, the prosumer version of the Sony HDR-HC1 camcorder, which was introduced in 2005
 AVM A1-Card, an ISDN card produced by German company AVM GmbH
 A1 VSTi, a 2002 synthesizer software program produced by Waldorf Music
 Xiaomi Mi A1, a smartphone released in 2017, part of series Mi and Android One
 Samsung Galaxy A01, a smartphone released in 2020

Vehicles and transport

Aircraft 

 A-1 (airship)
 A-1 Skyraider
 Albastar A1, glider
 Model 3 A-1, an Aeronautical Products rotorcraft, see List of rotorcraft

Cars 
 A1, a tyre code
 A1 Grand Prix car
 Anadol A1, a 1966 Turkish car
 Arrows A1, a 1978 British racing car
 Audi A1, a supermini automobile produced from 2010
 Audi Quattro A1, a 1983 rally car
 Chery A1
 Scania A1, a 1901 car
 Toyota A1, a 1935 car prototype
 A1 registration plate, a UK vehicle registration plate
 A1, a Volkswagen Group A platform
 A-1, a 1939 Buick Roadmaster Series 81C  used by Norwegian royalty

Maritime 
 A1 (shipping), a symbol indicating shipbuilding quality
 Sea Area A1, a designation in the Global Maritime Distress Safety System

Surface vessels 
 A-1 lifeboat
 , the name of multiple US Navy ships
 , an Argentine Navy auxiliary ship

Submarines 
 , a British A-class submarine of the Royal Navy
 A1 type submarine, a type of Japanese Navy submarine
 , a Royal Norwegian Navy submarine

Motorcycles 
 A1, a Haden (motorcycle) frame
 A1, a Motosacoche motorcycle
 A-1, a 1976 Alligator (motorcycle)
 Automatic A1, a Tomos motorcycle
 A1 Samurai, see List of Kawasaki motorcycles

Roads 
 Highways designated A1  in several countries; see List of A1 roads

Spacecraft

Satellites 
 A-001, the second abort test of the Apollo spacecraft
 Anik A1, a Canadian satellite
 Aussat (Optus) A1, a 1985 Australian telecommunications satellite
 Orbcomm A1, a 1997 American low Earth orbit communications satellite
 Palapa A1, the first 1976 Indonesian Palapa satellite
 Superbird A1, a satellite put into orbit by an Ariane 4 launch on 1 December 1992
 A1, a designation for the French satellite Astérix (satellite)

Rockets 
 A1, a model of German Aggregate Series Rocket from World War II
 Hermes A-1, a rocket in the Hermes project
 Saturn A-1, a 1959 American rocket
 Scout A-1, a 1965 American rocket

Fictional spacecraft 
 Alpha-One spacecraft, a fictional spacecraft in the film Buzz Lightyear of Star Command: The Adventure Begins

Trains and public transit 
 A1 Steam Locomotive Trust, a charitable trust
 Ayrshire Bus Owners (A1 Service), a bus operator in Scotland
 Bavarian A I, an 1844 German steam locomotive model
 LB&SCR A1 class, a class of locomotives designed by Stroudley and known as the Terriers
 LNER Gresley Classes A1 and A3, a locomotive class designed by Sir Nigel Gresley, including the Flying Scotsman
 LNER Thompson Class A1/1, the rebuild of 4470 Great Northern by Edward Thompson
 LNER Peppercorn Class A1, a class of Pacific locomotives designed by Arthur Peppercorn
 NCC Class A1, a 1901 Irish 4-4-0 passenger steam locomotives
 Nishi-magome Station, a Japanese subway station
 PRR A1, an American PRR steam locomotive
 Prussian A 1, a 1907 German Prussian railbus
 RER A1, a rapid transit line in France
 SP&S Class A1, a 1907 steam locomotives class
 Tel Aviv–Jerusalem railway, built on the “A1 Route”
 Type A1 or California combination, an Electric tram type 
 0-2-2, the UIC classification for the Whyte notation of locomotive wheel arrangements

See also 
 1A (disambiguation)
 A-1 Yola (disambiguation)
 AL (disambiguation)
 Aleph One (disambiguation)
 A10 (disambiguation)